Parashuram (English title The Man with the Axe) is a 1979 Bengali drama film directed by Mrinal Sen. It was entered into the 11th Moscow International Film Festival where it won the Silver Prize.

Cast
 Arun Mukherjee as Parashuram (as Arun Mukhopadhyay)
 Bibhas Chakraborty
 Sreela Majumdar as Alhadi
 Samaresh Banerjee (as Samaresh Bandyopadhyay)
 Jayanta Bhattacharya as Beggar
 Reba Roy Chowdhury
 Sujal Roy Chowdhury (as Sajal Roy Chowdhury)
 Arati Das
 Anuradha Debi (as Anuradha Deb)
 Radharani Devi
 Shailen Ganguli (as Shailen Gangopadhyay)

Awards

 National Film Award for Best Actor - Arun Mukherjee
 National Film Award for Best Editing - Gangadhar Naskar
 National Film Award – Special Mention (feature film) - Mrinal Sen

References

External links
 

1979 films
1979 drama films
1970s Bengali-language films
Bengali-language Indian films
Indian drama films
Films directed by Mrinal Sen
Films whose editor won the Best Film Editing National Award
Films featuring a Best Actor National Award-winning performance